The David and Gladys Wright House is a Frank Lloyd Wright residence built in 1952 in the Arcadia neighborhood of Phoenix, Arizona. It has historically been listed with an address of 5212 East Exeter Boulevard, but currently has an entrance on the 4500 block of North Rubicon Avenue.  There currently is no public access to the house.

This 2,500-square-foot concrete-block house was designed and built for the architect's son David and his wife, Gladys, and is situated among orange groves on a site facing north toward Camelback Mountain. The house has a spiral design to cool the house by capturing the wind. Though it has been claimed that the spiral ramp anticipated the design of the Solomon R. Guggenheim Museum in New York, the Guggenheim plan predates the design of the house, and Wright designed several buildings with spiral ramps beginning as early as the 1920s. 

David and Gladys Wright lived in the house until their deaths. David died in 1997 at the age of 102; Gladys died in 2008 at age 104. Gladys left the house to granddaughters who sold it. The new buyer in turn sold it to a real estate developer, 8081 Meridian, who planned to demolish the house and develop its 2.2 acre lot. Efforts to protect the building through a heritage designation were begun in August 2012. The house was purchased by a Delaware LLC, and the owner intends to transfer the property to a non-profit foundation, the David and Gladys Wright House Foundation.  On June 8, 2017, the 150th anniversary of Frank's birth, the home's owner, Zach Rawling, decided to donate the home to the School of Architecture at Taliesin, formerly known as the Frank Lloyd Wright School of Architecture.  He had hoped the house would be used as a living laboratory for architecture students. In June 2018 the deal was called off and the house was placed on the market in September for $12.9 million.

It was announced on August 17, 2020 that the Wright house was sold for US$7.25 million to Benson Botsford LLC:The buyers include architects Bing Hu and Wenchin Shi. They served as architectural apprentices at Frank Lloyd Wright’s Taliesin West. They plan on personally restoring the Wright House including installing a new copper roof which was part of Frank Lloyd Wright’s original plan.

Jim Benson, former chairman and CEO of John Hancock, serves as CEO of Benson Botsford LLC. Benson and Hu were also recently elected to serve on the board the School of Architecture at Taliesin (formerly the Frank Lloyd Wright School of Architecture).On January 28, 2022, the Wright house was listed in the National Register of Historic Places.

References 

 Storrer, William Allin. The Frank Lloyd Wright Companion. University Of Chicago Press, 2006,  (S.322)

External links
 Official Website
 Walkthrough, June 2012

Frank Lloyd Wright buildings
Houses in Phoenix, Arizona
Tourist attractions in Phoenix, Arizona